Marcelle Michau (born 14 August 1963) is a South African former cricketer. He played in 76 first-class and 74 List A matches between 1981/82 and 1994/95.

See also
 List of Eastern Province representative cricketers

References

External links
 

1963 births
Living people
South African cricketers
Eastern Province cricketers
Griqualand West cricketers
People from Cradock, Eastern Cape
Cricketers from the Eastern Cape